The county of Norfolk is divided into seven districts. The districts of Norfolk are Norwich, South Norfolk, Great Yarmouth, Broadland, North Norfolk, King's Lynn and West Norfolk, and Breckland.

As there are 839 Grade II* listed buildings in the county they have been split into separate lists for each district.

 Grade II* listed buildings in Breckland
 Grade II* listed buildings in Broadland
 Grade II* listed buildings in Great Yarmouth
 Grade II* listed buildings in King's Lynn and West Norfolk
 Grade II* listed buildings in North Norfolk
 Grade II* listed buildings in Norwich
 Grade II* listed buildings in South Norfolk

See also
 Grade I listed buildings in Norfolk

 
Lists of Grade II* listed buildings in Norfolk